The Avenue in the Rain is a 1917 oil painting by the American Impressionist painter Childe Hassam. It depicts Fifth Avenue in New York City in the rain, draped with U.S. flags. The painting is one of six works by Hassam in the permanent art collection of the White House in Washington, D.C.

Between 1916 and 1919, Hassam completed as many as thirty paintings showing city streets decorated with flags. Hassan called this series "the flag series." The Avenue in the Rain dates to February 1917, a time when patriotic fervor was rising and about two months before the United States entered the First World War. The previous month, Germany had extended its unrestricted submarine warfare to neutral ships, including American vessels. The Zimmermann Telegram became public knowledge at the end of February 1917, and the country declared war on Germany on April 6, 1917.

The painting measures  and is dominated by tones of blue and red. A large U.S. flag is depicted in the foreground, while a number of smaller flags fill the surrounding space and line Fifth Avenue into the background. Several dark figures in the middle distance hold umbrellas. The flags seem to float in mid-air, hanging from poles that project from unseen buildings. Their images are reflected on the wet street and sidewalk. In painting this work and others in the series, Hassam may have been influenced by two similar pieces by Claude Monet depicting national celebrations in Paris on June 30, 1878.

The painting was donated to the White House in 1963 by Thomas Mellon Evans and hung between the windows in John F. Kennedy's blue-themed President's Bedroom (now a private sitting room, adjacent to the Yellow Oval Room on the second floor). It was in the President's Dining Room for many years and hung in the Oval Office during Bill Clinton's, Barack Obama's, and Donald Trump’s terms, as well as currently under Joe Biden's term.

The painting (ostensibly a replica) has been featured in multiple fictitious oval offices including the CBS show Madam Secretary and the NBC show The West Wing.

Other works by Childe Hassam with flags, 1916-1919

Claude Monet

See also
 Art in the White House

References

 The Avenue in the Rain, Treasures of the White House, The White House Historical Association
 The Avenue in the Rain, Digital Library, The White House Historical Association
 Living Room, WhiteHouseMuseum.org

1919 paintings
Art in the White House
New York City in popular culture
Flags in art
Rain in art
Paintings by Childe Hassam